Kevin Bullis is an American former college football coach. He served as the head football coach at the University of Wisconsin–Whitewater from 2015 to 2022, compiling a record of 78–13. He was initially named interim head coach when his predecessor, Lance Leipold, left the school to take the head coaching job at the University at Buffalo. Bullis was named to the position on a permanent basis on January 30, 2015. He retired in November 2022.

Head coaching record

References

External links
 Wisconsin–Whitewater profile

Year of birth missing (living people)
Living people
Gustavus Adolphus Golden Gusties football coaches
Minnesota Morris Cougars football coaches
Wisconsin–River Falls Falcons football coaches
Wisconsin–Whitewater Warhawks football coaches
University of Minnesota Morris alumni